Rebeca Bou Nogueiro (born 7 March 1987) is a Spanish former professional tennis player.

Born in Barcelona, Bou made her only WTA Tour main draw appearance in her home city, as a doubles wildcard pairing with Maite Gabarrús-Alonso at the Barcelona Ladies Open.

Bou reached career-high rankings of 327 in singles and 375 in doubles.

ITF finals

Singles: 6 (3–3)

Doubles: 8 (3–4)

References

External links
 
 

1987 births
Living people
Spanish female tennis players
Tennis players from Barcelona
Sportswomen from Catalonia